The Rhodesian cricket team represented originally the British colony of Southern Rhodesia and later the unilaterally independent state of Rhodesia.

Rhodesia's inaugural first-class match commenced on 16 March 1905 against Transvaal at Old Wanderers in Johannesburg, South Africa and its first limited overs match on 13 December 1970, against Natal at Police B Ground, Salisbury, Rhodesia. In all, 242 cricketers represented Rhodesia in either first-class or List A cricket between 1905 and 1980, when the Rhodesian cricket team was renamed as the Zimbabwe-Rhodesia cricket team before adopting its current name Zimbabwe cricket team in 1981.

When Rhodesia participated in South Africa's domestic competitions, Rhodesian players were eligible to play for South Africa. Several of the players listed also represented Zimbabwe in Test and One Day International cricket and one, John Traicos, represented South Africa and Zimbabwe.

While some of the cricketers listed below represented other teams the information included is solely for their career with Rhodesia, including matches played by the "Rhodesian Invitational XI".

Key
 First – Year of debut
 Last – Year of latest game
 Apps – Number of matches played
  – Player has played a Test match or Limited Overs International for Zimbabwe.
  - Player has played a Test match or Limited Overs International for a country other than Zimbabwe.

Cricketers

References

Zimbabwean cricket lists
South African cricket lists
Rhodesian cricket from 1890–91 to 1979–80
History of Zimbabwean cricket
Rhodesian representative cricketers